Ojo is a Nigerian surname of Yoruba origin. Notable people with the name include:

Funso Ojo (born 1991), Belgian football player
Kim Ojo (born 1988), Nigerian football midfielder
Michael Ojo (born 1989), Nigerian-American basketball player
Michael Ojo (1993–2020), Nigerian-American basketball player
Onome Ojo (born 1977), Nigerian-American football player
Sheyi Ojo (born 1997), English football player
Tessy Ojo (born 1971), Nigerian-British charity executive 
Topsy Ojo (born 1985), English rugby union player
Ronke Ojo (born 1974), Nigerian movieactress
Benjamin Ojo (born 2000)
Yoruba-language surnames